The Fiat Punto is a supermini car (B-segment) produced by the Italian manufacturer Fiat from 1993 to 2018, spanning over three generations. The third generation of the car was marketed between 2005 and 2009 as the Grande Punto, and between 2009 and 2012 as the Punto Evo, until the single-word Punto name was reintroduced. , nearly nine million units had been sold globally.

Production of the first generation Punto was 3.429 million units, second generation 2.96 million units, and third generation 2.67 million units.



First generation (176; 1993)

Internally codenamed Project 176, the Punto was announced in September 1993, as a replacement for the aging Fiat Uno, and launched at the end of 1993 or the beginning of 1994, depending on the market. The Fiat Punto was voted European Car of the Year for 1995, defeating rival Volkswagen Polo by only 78 points.

The official launch of the Punto in the United Kingdom was in October 1993, at the London Motorfair.

The Punto was designed by Giorgetto Giugiaro, and originated as a 1990 design proposal for Renault's project X57, which would become the Renault Clio. When Giugiaro's proposal was not chosen, he took the design to Fiat, who accepted it. The Punto was available as a three-door or five-door hatchback, a two-door cabriolet and a three-door panel van. As the majority of the new Fiat group models, the suspension was all independent, composed of MacPherson struts at the front and trailing arms at the rear.

Entry level in the Punto range were the 1.1 and 1.2 L petrol engines and the 1.7 diesel engine. The 1.2 engine's actual capacity is 1242 cc, available in three versions. The first, was fitted in the Punto ELX 75 and produced  at 6000 rpm while the second, fitted to Punto ELX 85 produced  at 6000 rpm.

The third was a  engine which eventually replaced the 1.1  engine.

Sporting versions

GT versions

Convertible
A cabriolet (convertible) version was also available; built by Bertone (rather than at the main Fiat factory), it featured an electric-powered fully retracting roof and was one of the cheapest open-top cars in the world at the time. In Europe, the car was also made with a manual roof.

Available in both ELX and SX trim, initially powered by the  1.6 Mpi unit (replaced in 1995 by the  1.2 litre 16v unit FIRE). Approximately 55,000 cars were built between April 1994 and June 1999, although the last cars were registered in 2000.

Other versions
Particular versions of the first generation Punto were the Punto 6Speed, a 1.1 FIRE Punto 55 with a six-speed gearbox, the Punto Selecta with a CVT type automatic gearbox, and the Punto ED (Economical Drive), a 1.1 Punto whose five-speed gearbox was designed for high fuel efficiency.

Punto Grama 2 Maggiora
Maggiora created the Punto Grama 2 by using Lancia Dedra integrale underpinnings.

Engines

Second generation (188; 1999)

The second generation Punto codenamed Project 188, was launched in September 1999 at the Frankfurt Motor Show. The styling was all-new while retaining the original Punto's distinctive shape and design, while the chassis and interior were completely overhauled, with a new torsion beam rear suspension.

The new Punto also became the first Fiat in decades to carry the original round Fiat badge to celebrate Fiat's centenary.

At the launch event of the hatchback, the Fiat Wish concept car was also presented, which was hardtop convertible version of the Fiat Punto, very similar in styling with the Peugeot 206 CC. The model was conceived by Pininfarina to celebrate the centenary of Fiat.

Entry level
The 1.1 and 1.4 engines were discontinued due to emissions issues and the entry level models had only a 1.2 petrol unit, with either 8 or 16 valves, giving  and  respectively, or a 1.9L diesel, with common rail injection and turbocharger or naturally aspired with mechanical injection.

Sporting versions

Two sporty versions were offered. The 1.2 16 valve Sporting model with a six-speed manual, and the 1.8 HGT which could reach almost . The 1.2 16V model also has a Speedgear CVT equipped variant (with a sequential manual shift mode consisting of six gears, seven for the Sporting model).

The 1.8 HGT accelerates from 0 to 60 in 8.0 seconds. It was considered a big improvement in handling over the Punto GT. The HGT was also available (in limited numbers) as an "HGT Abarth" which added deeper bumpers, rear spoiler, side skirts, new alloy wheels, and interior trim. The HGT Abarth had no technical improvements over the regular HGT.

Power steering
The second generation Punto has also adopted the Dualdrive electric power steering and came with two operation modes, using an electric motor, rather than a hydraulic pump driven by the engine.

This resulted in reduced fuel consumption and less environmental impact.

Facelift

At the beginning of 2003, Fiat celebrated the rollout of the 5,000,000th production Punto. During the same year, the second generation facelift brought further revisions to the platform, including extensive changes to the exterior styling and engines, partly due to changes in pedestrian safety regulations.

The round Fiat badge, found only on the bonnet of second-generation models, was introduced on the tailgate of the second generation facelift. On 1 June 2005, Fiat produced the 6,000,000th Punto at the Melfi plant.

Engine changes included a new 1.4 L 16v engine, alongside the staple 1.2 and 1.2 L 16v variants, and the introduction of two HGT versions, the 1.9 L MultiJet diesel engine and the 1.8 L 16v petrol engine, which could reach almost  continued over from the pre-facelift version. There was an introduction also of the 1.3 L common rail diesel MultiJet engine.

Punto Classic
Despite the launch of the slightly larger Grande Punto at the end of 2005, the second generation Punto remained in production, marketed as the Punto Classic, and has been sold in many emerging markets in addition to the newer versions. It was launched for the first time in Chile in 2007. It ended production in Italy in November 2010.

Zastava 10

In October 2005, Serbian automotive manufacturer Zastava reached an agreement with Fiat to assemble this version under licence in Kragujevac, Serbia, with the model name Zastava 10. After acquiring a majority stake in Zastava in the autumn of 2008, Fiat continued production of this vehicle under the Fiat Punto Classic name from March 2009.

Production was stopped in middle of 2011, and restarted in 2013, albeit very briefly. It has been available with the 1.2 litre petrol engine and later, also with the 1.3 litre diesel engine, the version of 2013 featured a newer, more modern engine.

Trim levels
The Punto was initially released in four different trim levels: S, SX, ELX and HLX, that were later renamed to Actual, Active, Dynamic and Emotion. Three special versions of the three door hatchback were also available: Sporting, HGT and Abarth. The 'Sporting' had a six speed manual gearbox as standard.

The top-level included such features as ABS, front and side airbags, window bags, remote central locking, front power windows, electrical power steering, air conditioning, a trip computer with four functions, CD player, CD changer, alloy rims and fog lamps. Options such as navigation and burglar alarm were also offered.

After the facelift, it also received EBD, ESP with ASR and hill holder, climate control with double zone heating, heated seats, MP3 player and subwoofer (HGT only), rear parking sensors and cruise control as an option. A revised instrument panel with a larger display could now show the instant consumption too.

Engines
Four petrol engines with multi-point injection system were available, as well as one indirect injection diesel and three common rail turbocharged diesel engines with intercooler (JTD and MultiJet). The 1.8 16v and the 1.9 MultiJet engines were available only with the three-door version in the HGT trim level.

Third generation (199; 2005)

The Grande Punto, codenamed Project 199, was unveiled at the 2005 Frankfurt Motor Show and went on sale later on that year. Again styled by Giugiaro, the car is based on the Fiat Small platform developed in joint venture with Opel-General Motors.

The third generation Fiat to bear the name Punto, codenamed Project 199, the Grande Punto was unveiled at the 2005 Frankfurt Motor Show and went on sale later that year. Styled by Giugiaro, the car is based on the GM Fiat Small platform.

Whilst the model shares some of its name with the previous Punto, a large number of its components are new, including a new chassis and body shell.

The engines are the Fiat 1.2 8v Fire (65 PS), a new 1.4 8v Fire (77 PS) and the 1.4 16v StarJet (95 PS). The 1.9 diesel was replaced with the new 1.6 MultiJet starting the end of 2008.

All the engines are Euro IV compliant. In 2007, a new 1.4 16v T-Jet turbocharged petrol engine, became available. At the 2007 Frankfurt Motor Show, Fiat introduced  an Abarth version by Abarth & C S.p.A. It was branded as an Abarth rather than Fiat.

The car's nose, headlights and front grill look reminiscent of the Maserati Coupé (both were designed by Giorgetto Giugiaro of ItalDesign).

Other markets
In Australia, Fiat introduced the Grande Punto in July 2006, sold only as the Punto; it was the first Fiat to be sold in Australia since 1989. In 2009, the Punto was discontinued in Australia, due to slow sales. The car was reintroduced in 2013 after Fiat began factory distribution in Australia, the car was repriced at a much lower price, that was more in keeping with its rivals. In September 2015, the Punto was once again pulled from the Australian market due to slow sales.

It was launched in Mexico in November 2006. The Grande Punto is placed above the Fiat Palio in the Mexican Fiat car lineup. Initially it was sold with the 1.4 16v StarJet  engine with six speed manual gearbox in five door Dynamic and three door Sport trims. In December 2007, the 1.4 16v T-Jet  variant was launched.

The Italian made Grande Punto was launched in Chile and the Dominican Republic in petrol and diesel versions. The Grande Punto also went on sale in South Africa in 2006, replacing the previous generation.

In the rest of South America, the Brazilian built Grande Punto (called only Punto) was launched in August 2007. Codenamed Project 310, it is produced in the factory of Betim, Minas Gerais, Brazil. The chassis is an adaptation of the Fiat Palio, a lower cost compact. Levels of safety were not maintained (airbags and ABS are optional on lower trim levels, and the highest one has only two airbags as standard), but the ride comfort is said to be the same.

The five door version was the only one available in the Brazilian line, and there were no plans for a two-door version (in Brazil, two door vehicles are only accepted for cheaper cars). The engines available at launch were the  1.4 Fire 8v and the  1.8 Ecotec-Family 1 X18XE engine that comes from GM-Fiat/Powertrain, and later the 1.4 Fire 16v TurboJet, also available for the Linea.

For the model of 2011, there were added the new E.TorQ engines 1.6 16v and 1.8 16v. Produced by Fiat Powertrain Technologies, they were based on the discontinued Tritec engines. All non Turbo petrol models produced in Brazil are flex-fuel.

The Grande Punto was launched in India during the Delhi Auto Expo in January 2008, with sales starting in June 2009. The Punto for the Indian market was manufactured by the Fiat / Tata Motors joint venture Fiat India Automobiles Ltd (FIAL) in a new plant in Ranjangaon, Maharashtra and based on the same 310 project of the Brazilian Punto.

A related sedan car, the Fiat Linea, was launched in the beginning of 2007 to replace the ageing Fiat Marea.

Safety
The Grande Punto was awarded with five stars in the Euro NCAP crash test for passenger protection, and three stars certification for pedestrian safety. The most powerful engines have electronic stability program and anti slip regulation fitted as standard, and it is an optional extra on some of the lower powered engines.

However, in a later test in December 2017, the car was retested with a zero star rating by Euro NCAP, receiving 51% for adult occupants, 43% for child occupant, 52% for pedestrian and 0% for safety assist. One of the given reasons for this is the fact that the third generation Punto was launched in 2005, making the car a twelve year old model, whose safety standards were never actually updated.

Abarth Grande Punto (2007–2010)
The first car from the newly created (2007) Fiat owned Abarth & C. S.p.A., the Abarth Grande Punto differs significantly from its donor car.

Initially the Abarth Grande Punto was released with a 150 PS (155 PS when using 97 RON fuel) 1.4 turbo engine, but from 2008, there was available an Essesse kit, which could be installed at official Abarth service centres rather than in the factory.

2009 facelift (Punto Evo)
The Punto Evo, a facelift version of the Grande Punto, was presented in September 2009 at the Frankfurt Motor Show. It received a new front end, in addition to revised rear lights, and a new interior. It has two new engines, a 1.3 L second generation Multijet diesel and a 1.4 L petrol engine with the MultiAir technology. It also features a new navigation system integrated to the Blue&Me system called Blue&Me–TomTom.

Abarth Punto Evo (2010–2015)
The Abarth Punto Evo was shown at 2010 Geneva Motor Show. It has a   MultiAir Turbo inline-four engine.

A new Esseesse version was released in 2011, which was an optional upgrade that improved performance, with a 0– time of 7.3 seconds. The Abarth Punto Evo was discontinued in 2015, after slow sales.

2012 facelift
Fiat introduced the 2012 Punto in September 2011 at the Frankfurt Motor Show, as a facelifted version of the Punto Evo that reintroduced the Punto nomenclature (without Grande or Evo). The facelift was consisted of slighter tweaks than changing from Grande Punto to Punto Evo, keeping the revised rear lights and interior of the 2009 Punto Evo, but not on the base 'Pop' trim level which reverted to the older Grande Punto interior.

In October 2014, Top Gear Magazine placed the Punto Pop 1.2 liter 8v 69 on its list of The Worst Cars You Can Buy Right Now, describing the car as "An outclassed elderly supermini that kicks out 126 g/km yet takes 14.4 secs to wheeze to 62 mph, and it costs more than £10k."

From 2015 (when the production of three door version was cancelled) only five door version was available in Europe.

In June 2016, Fiat introduced the new Techno Pack with the  5” touchscreen infotainment system and cruise control. Production of the Punto ended on 7 August 2018, with no direct successor being announced. However, it continued to sell in India for an additional two more months before production ended in October of that year. The last Punto assembled in Melfi was a red five door model.

2014 Indian facelift (Punto Evo) 
Fiat India gave the Punto Evo an extensive and exclusive facelift in August 2014. The facelift consisted of large, swept back headlamps, a new grille and chrome inserts, whilst the rear of the car received LED taillamps from its European twin, and the dashboard from the European car. This car also sports an SUV like ground clearance of 185mm for diesel and 195mm for petrol to suit Indian roads. In August 2015, Fiat launched in India the Abarth brand, imported from Poland the Abarth 595 Competizione and the locally produced Abarth Punto, based on the 310-Punto five door.

Transmission is a five speed manual.

Fiat India launched a crossover version of the Punto Evo called Avventura in India in October 2014. The Avventura was aimed at the market inhabited by the likes of Toyota Etios Cross, Volkswagen CrossPolo and Ford EcoSport.

Production in India ended in November 2018, together with the Abarth and Adventure versions. As a result, Fiat Chrysler Automobiles decided to withdraw the Fiat brand from the Indian market, leaving space to the brand of Jeep.

Punto Van
The Punto Van is a compact van designed for the commercial market. It features a petrol 1.2 8v engine, a petrol/CNG 1.2 8v engine, and a diesel 1.3 MultiJet 16v engine.

Engines

Source: FiatAutoPress.com

Motorsport

The Punto has always been popular with amateur racing drivers due to its low cost and the wide availability of spare parts. Numerous competition and homologated versions of the Punto have been produced, such as the Punto Rally, the S1600, and the Punto Abarth.

A new rally car based on the third generation Punto, the Super 2000 Punto Abarth, was unveiled in 2005. It is four-wheel drive and powered by a 2.0 L 16 valve engine capable of producing . Also, a turbodiesel front wheel drive rally car has been produced, the Fiat Grande Punto R3D.

The Punto was the first diesel car to compete in the Targa Tasmania.

The Punto has won several rally championships, specifically:
 Italian Rally Championship (2003 and 2006)
 European Rally Championship (2006)
 2006 International Rally Challenge season

A motorsport version of the car can be found in several liveries in the video games Colin McRae Rally 04, Colin McRae: DiRT, Sega Rally Revo and Gran Turismo 6.

Notes

See also
Fiat Linea

References

External links

 Official Fiat Punto UK page
 Fiat Punto models, specifications and troubleshooting

Punto
Subcompact cars
Euro NCAP superminis
Vehicles with CVT transmission
Cars introduced in 1993
2000s cars
2010s cars
Bertone vehicles
Italdesign vehicles
Convertibles
Rally cars
Hot hatches
Cars of India